Grady Cole and Hazel Cole were a husband-and-wife songwriting team that produced many hits in the 1930s and 1940s.  They are best known for the gospel tune "The Tramp on the Street", a song popularized by Hank Williams and Joan Baez.

References

People from LaFayette, Georgia
Songwriters from Georgia (U.S. state)